Coleophora microalbella is a moth of the family Coleophoridae. It is found on the Canary Islands (Fuerteventura), Spain, Algeria, Tunisia, the Palestinian territories and Oman.

The larva feeds on Salsola species.

References

microalbella
Moths described in 1935
Moths of Asia
Moths of Africa
Moths of Europe